Margaret Nales Wilson, known as Maggie Wilson (born March 15, 1989), is a Filipino-British beauty queen, TV personality, actress, model and entrepreneur.

Early life

Wilson was born in Bacolod City and raised in Jeddah, Saudi Arabia. One of the two children to Robert and Sonia Wilson, she is of Scottish, Irish, Filipino, and Chinese descent.

Wilson attended Al Hekma International School and later SoFA Design Institute, School of Interior Design.

She was an accomplished competitive swimmer and show jumper before moving to Manila, Philippines in 2004.

Career

Wilson's first TV appearance was for GMA Network 7's Kakabakaba Adventure (2003) where she was a regular cast member until the show ended in 2004. Between 2003 and 2011, Wilson appeared and starred in several TV series and soap operas. With supporting roles in All Together Now (2004), Encantadia (2005), Darna (2005), Asian Treasures (2007) and Joaquin Bordado (2008). As part of the main cast in Saang Sulok ng Langit (2005), where she was nominated as Best TV Villain, My Guardian Abby (2006), Darna (2009) and Beauty Queen (2010).

Wilson has also appeared in several TV commercials and advertisements for the Taiwan Tourism Board, Bench, Globe Telecom, Greenwich, Creamsilk, Tresemme, Antica Murrina, Happy Skin & Traveloka and Luminisce Skin.

In 2006, MTV (Philippines) launched Wilson as part of their roster of VJ's (Video Jockey). Where she hosted the show, MTV Time Out, as well concerts featuring of Rihanna, Chris Brown and Christina Aguilera to name a few. She has interviewed Incubus, Fall Out Boy, Simple Plan, Harry Connick Jr. and many more. She was a VJ until 2010.

In 2007, Maggie Wilson won Binibining Pilipinas World (Miss World Philippines). She was 17 years old at the time.

Maggie has been featured on the cover of several magazines such as Candy, Chalk, Manual, FHM (Philippines), UNO, Metro Society, Northern Living, Enclaves and Lifestyle Asia.

In 2016, Wilson won the fifth season of The Amazing Race Asia with Parul Shah.

In March 2017, Wilson was cast as the main host for Philippines' Next Top Model cycle 3 on TV5.

Wilson made history in November 2017 when she became the first Filipino woman to complete a marathon in Antarctica.

In October 2018, she opened Casa Consunji, a furniture and decor store.

Currently, Wilson co-hosts Beached, a travel show on Metro Channel with Marc Saw Nelson.

Personal life
Wilson married Victor Consunji on December 18, 2010. She gave birth to their son Connor in 2012. In an Instagram post on September 27, 2021, Wilson announced her separation from Consunji.

Wilson is thought to be dating Tim Connor the Great Grandson of Mom Chao Jayankura (Her Serene Highness Princess of Thailand).

Filmography

Film
Let the Love Begin (2005)
Babang Luksa (as Sheryl) (2011, GMA Films)

See also
Binibining Pilipinas 2007

References

External links
 Bb Pilipinas Photo
 

1989 births
Visayan people
Filipino child actresses
Filipino people of British descent
Filipino people of Scottish descent
Filipino television actresses
Living people
Filipino female models
British female models
Binibining Pilipinas winners
Miss World 2007 delegates
VJs (media personalities)
People from Bacolod
Actresses from Negros Occidental
Filipino expatriates in Saudi Arabia
Filipino female marathon runners
The Amazing Race contestants
Reality show winners
GMA Network personalities